The San Francisco Climate Action Plan is a greenhouse gas reduction initiative adopted by the City and County of San Francisco, United States in 2002. It aims to reduce the city's greenhouse gas emissions to 20% below 1990 levels by 2012.  The plan was updated in 2013 to adopt an updated target of 40% below 1990 levels by 2025.

Greenhouse gas emissions 
San Francisco's annual greenhouse gas emissions were 9.7 million tons equivalent carbon dioxide (eCO2) in 2000., which was 12.5 tons eCO2 per person. This level of emissions is lower than both the state and country in which San Francisco is located: California's annual per capita emissions of 14.2 tons eCO2 in 2000, and USA's annual per capita emissions of 20.4 CO2 in 2000. However, it is much higher than the emissions level for the world as a whole, which was 4.4 tons CO2 per person in 2003.

History 
The Climate Action Plan is one of many initiatives adopted by state and local governments in the USA to reduce greenhouse gas emissions, enacted primarily in response due to the absence of such action at the federal level.  It was approved by the San Francisco Board of Supervisors as Resolution Number 0158-02, the Greenhouse Gas Emission Reduction Resolution, on 2002-03-04. In doing so, San Francisco also joined over 500 cities to participate in the Cities for Climate Protection Campaign of the International Council for Local Environmental Initiatives.

Goals 
San Francisco's annual greenhouse gas emissions were 9.1 million tons equivalent carbon dioxide (eCO2) in 1990 and 9.7 million tons eCO2 in 2000, and the Climate Action Plan's goal is to reduce emissions to 7.2 million tons eCO2 by 2012. This goals therefore represent reductions of greenhouse gas emissions of 20% from 1990 levels and 26% from 2000 levels. The sources of greenhouse gases include those generated due to fossil fuel and electricity consumption used for transportation, natural gas and electricity used in buildings, and well as those generated by solid waste.

Reports 
The plan's first report, Climate Action Plan for San Francisco, Local Actions to Reduce Greenhouse Gas Emissions was published by the San Francisco Department of the Environment and the San Francisco Public Utilities Commission with assistance from the International Council for Local Environmental Initiatives in September 2004. In four chapters, the report describes the causes and local impacts of climate change, the city's greenhouse gas emissions reduction target, actions to reduce those emissions, and an implementation strategy for the near term.

The 2004 report proposes a wide variety of actions to achieve its stated emissions reductions, which fall into the following categories: transportation, energy efficiency, renewable energy, and solid waste. Within each category, each action is described including an estimate for the CO2 emissions reduction it would result in. The table below summarizes these.

Results 
San Francisco met its Climate Action Plan targets with a 28.5% reduction from 1990 levels.  The 2015 total 4.4 million mtCO2e .

See also
Individual and political action on climate change
Climate change mitigation
List of countries by carbon dioxide emissions per capita
San Francisco Mandatory Recycling and Composting Ordinance
San Diego Climate Action Plan

References

Climate Action Plan for San Francisco

External links
 Full text of the Kyoto Protocol (HTML version), (PDF version)
 State Climate Action Plan Fact Sheet

Climate change law
Climate change policy
Environment of the San Francisco Bay Area
Climate action plans